Pogoria (train) was a Polish fast train, which crossed the country from south to northeast, on the route Racibórz - Ełk - Racibórz. It began service in 1980, and across the years, its route changed several times. Among others, it went on the routes Bielsko-Biała - Ełk - Bielsko-Biała, and Racibórz - Suwałki - Racibórz. In 2004, Pogoria was merged with Wigry, which went from Gliwice to Suwałki.

In the year 2002, Pogoria's route was as follows:
 Racibórz - Rybnik - Mikołów - Orzesze - Katowice - Sosnowiec - Dąbrowa Górnicza - Zawiercie - Częstochowa - Warszawa - Olsztyn - Giżycko - Ełk, and the train was seasonal, running only in the summer, and on major holidays.

References 

Named passenger trains of Poland